Portsmouth High School (PHS) is a public high school in Portsmouth, Ohio, United States.  The school's athletic teams are known as the Trojans and the school colors are red and blue.

History 
PHS has served the city since its founding in the 1830s and is the only public high school in Portsmouth.  In 2000, Portsmouth voters passed a much needed school bond issue, which helped construct new schools for the district.  The new schools opened for the 2006–2007 school year.  These schools won the Grand Prize from School Planning & Management's 2007 Education Design Showcase.  The award is awarded annually to the K-12 school that displays "excellence in design and functional planning directed toward meeting the needs of the educational program."  In addition, the school system finished building a $10 million athletic complex in 2009. It includes a new football field, baseball field, softball field, and track.

Athletics
The Portsmouth Trojans are part of the Ohio Valley Conference (OVC)

Ohio High School Athletic Association state championships

 Boys Basketball – 1931, 1961, 1978, 1988

OHSAA Final Four basketball appearances
1925, 1926, 1927, 1929, 1931 (1st), 1934 (2nd), 1939, 1941, 1961 (1st), 1978 (1st), 1980 (2nd), 1988 (1st), 1990 (2nd), 2011 & 2012 (2nd)

Notable alumni
Henry T. Bannon - Ohio politician
Kathleen Battle - opera star
Gerald Cadogan -  former NFL player 
Bill Harsha - Ohio politician
Larry Hisle - former Major League Baseball player
Rocky Nelson - former Major League Baseball player
Al Oliver - former Major League Baseball player
Del Rice - former Major League Baseball player
Barbara Robinson - author of The Best Christmas Pageant Ever
Herb Roe - mural artist

Notes and references

External links

 
 

High schools in Scioto County, Ohio
Public high schools in Ohio
Educational institutions established in the 1830s
1830s establishments in Ohio
Portsmouth, Ohio